Mary McNeil is a Canadian politician, who was elected as a BC Liberal party Member of the Legislative Assembly of British Columbia in the 2009 provincial election, representing the riding of Vancouver-False Creek.

McNeil was appointed Minister of State for the Olympics and Act Now BC.

She served as president and CEO of the BC Cancer Foundation for eight years. She has served in key roles for international economic events including the G7 meetings in Halifax and Toronto, APEC in Vancouver and the XI international conference on AIDS. She also served on the Vancouver Police Board for four years.

References

British Columbia Liberal Party MLAs
Women government ministers of Canada
Members of the Executive Council of British Columbia
Women MLAs in British Columbia
Politicians from Vancouver
Living people
21st-century Canadian politicians
21st-century Canadian women politicians
Year of birth missing (living people)